Simodontus is a genus of beetles in the family Carabidae, containing the following species:

 Simodontus aeneipennis Chaudoir, 1843
 Simodontus australis (Dejean, 1828)
 Simodontus brunnicolor Lorenz, 1998
 Simodontus clermonti (Straneo, 1937)
 Simodontus convexus Chaudoir, 1873
 Simodontus curtulus Chaudoir, 1873
 Simodontus fortnumi (Castelnau, 1867)
 Simodontus grandiceps Sloane, 1900
 Simodontus holomelanus (Germar, 1848)
 Simodontus laeviceps Sloane, 1900
 Simodontus leai Sloane, 1898
 Simodontus murrayensis Blackburn, 1890
 Simodontus occultus Sloane, 1898
 Simodontus picescens Chaudoir, 1873
 Simodontus sexfoveatus (Chaudoir, 1878)
 Simodontus rotundipennis (Castelnau, 1867)
 Simodontus transfuga Chaudoir, 1873
 Simodontus rufipalpis (Castelnau, 1867)

References

Pterostichinae